Harvey Karten, M.D. is professor emeritus of neuroscience at the University of California, San Diego School of Medicine.

Karten is a member of the National Academy of Sciences, and was a founding faculty member of the UCSD School of Medicine. Karten is known for evolutionary analyses of non-mammalian brains; his current work includes the development of a cell-based database of brain regions, neurons, connections, and chemical properties.

References

American neuroscientists
Living people
Members of the United States National Academy of Sciences
Year of birth missing (living people)